Quinqui jargon is associated with quincalleros (tinkers), a semi-nomadic group who live mainly in the northern half of Spain. They prefer to be called mercheros. They are reduced in number and possibly vanishing as a distinct group.

The language is an old form of Castilian, Germanía, with elements of Caló, a dialect of the Spanish Roma.  The term comes from the word quincallería (ironmongery), from ironmongers who originated this cant as part of their trade.  Because the men were frequently blamed for petty crime, in modern Spanish the word is associated with references to delinquent, petty thief, or hoodlum. The mercheros identify as a distinct group separate from the Roma gitanos.

Scholars have many theories about the social origins of mercheros, summarized as the following:  
Descendants of mechanical workers who arrived in Spain from central Europe in the 16th century;
Descendants of peasants who lost their land in the 16th century; 
Descendants of intermarriage between the Roma and non-Roma populations; 
Descendants of Muslims who became nomads after the expulsion in the 15th century to escape persecution; and/or 
A mixture of the above.

Notable mercheros
Eleuterio Sánchez, a.k.a. El Lute (born 1942).  A petty thief in his early life, he was convicted of armed robbery and murder; after escaping from prison, he was listed as "The Most Wanted" by the Spanish police.  Later he earned a law degree and wrote five books.  He was pardoned at age 39.

See also
Caló (Spanish Romani)
Yeniche people
Sarakatsani
Gacería
Irish Travellers
Vaqueiros de alzada

References

Languages of Spain
Spanish dialects of Spain
Cant languages
Modern nomads
Occupational cryptolects